Stade Francis Turcan is a multi-use stadium in Martigues, France.  It is currently used mostly for football matches and is the home stadium of FC Martigues. The stadium is able to hold 8,289 people.

References

Francis Turcan
FC Martigues
Sports venues in Bouches-du-Rhône
Sports venues completed in 1965